This is a list of films produced by the Ollywood film industry based in Bhubaneshwar and Cuttack in 1976:

A-Z

References

1976
Ollywood
Films, Ollywood
1970s in Orissa